Ladigesocypris is a small genus of freshwater ray-finned fish from the carp and minnow family, Cyprinidae. It comprises two species which are endemic to Anatolia.

Species
The two species included in this genus are:

Ladigesocypris irideus  (Ladiges, 1960) Anatolian Ghizani
Ladigesocypris mermere  (Ladiges, 1960) Izmir minnow

References

 
Endemic fauna of Turkey
Taxonomy articles created by Polbot